The 1924 Wabash Little Giants football team represented Wabash College in the 1924 college football season.

Schedule

References

Wabash
Wabash Little Giants football seasons
Wabash Little Giants football